Ricinocarpos pinifolius, commonly known as wedding bush,   is a shrub  of the family Euphorbiaceae and is endemic to eastern Australia. It has fragrant daisy-like flowers in spring.

Description
The  clusters of flowers are in leaf axils, usually 3-6 male and 1 female flower.

Taxonomy and naming
Ricinocarpos pinifolius was first formally described in 1817 by  René Louiche Desfontaines and the description was published in  Memoires du Museum d'Histoire Naturelle. The specific epithet (pinifolius) is from the Latin words pinus meaning "pine" and folium meaning "leaf".

Distribution and habitat
The wedding bush is found in sandy soils in heath and open forests mostly in coastal locations in New South Wales, Queensland, Victoria,  Tasmania and the Northern Territory.

References 

Crotonoideae
Malpighiales of Australia
Flora of New South Wales
Garden plants